Protective Enclosures Company (PEC) is a privately owned accessory company that produces enclosures for TVs. The company was founded in 2009 as a manufacturer of water-resistant outdoor TV enclosures.

History 
The company was launched in 2009.

In October 2016, PEC announced a partnership with Philips in the production of outdoor digital signage solutions.

Products 
In 2013, PEC introduced The Display Shield. In 2015, PEC produced a hybrid metal digital display enclosure, The TV Shield PRO.

Recognition 
In 2020, a report by Advance Market Analysis named PEC's TV Shield among the "top players in the outdoor TV market". The firm was recognized at several special features in media and TV.

References 

Manufacturing companies established in 2009
Companies based in Florida